G. macrophyllum may refer to:
 Geniostoma macrophyllum, a plant species endemic to Fiji
 Geum macrophyllum, the largeleaf avens, a flowering plant found In Northern America

See also